

1970

Awards and honours
CFL's Most Outstanding Player Award – Ron Lancaster
Jeff Nicklin Memorial Trophy – Ron Lancaster

1971

The Roughriders offence had 282 points for, while the defence had 329 points allowed

Schedule

Postseason

Awards and honours
George Reed, Running Back, CFL All-Star, Offence
Jack Abendschan, Guard, CFL All-Star, Offence

1972

The Roughriders offence had 306 points for, while the defence had 251 points allowed

Schedule

Postseason

Awards and honours
George Reed, Running Back, CFL All-Star, Offence
Jack Abendschan, Guard, CFL All-Star, Offence

1973

The Roughriders offence had 315 points for, while the defence had 280 points allowed

Schedule

Postseason

1974

The Roughriders offence had 271 points for, while the defence had 258 points allowed

Schedule

Postseason

1975

The Roughriders offence had 349 points for, while the defence had 294 points allowed

Schedule

Postseason

1976

The Roughriders offence had 361 points for, while the defence had 221 points allowed. This is the most recent season (as of 2016) where the Roughriders finished first overall in the CFL.

Schedule

Postseason

Grey Cup

1977

The Roughriders offence had 227 points for, while the defence had 305 points allowed

Schedule

Awards and honours
CFLPA's Most Outstanding Community Service Award – Ron Lancaster

1978

The Roughriders offence had 330 points for, while the defence had 459 points allowed

Schedule

1979

The Roughriders offence scored 194 points while the defence allowed 437 points. In May 1979, the Ottawa Rough Riders traded Tom Clements to the Saskatchewan Roughriders. Ron Lancaster became Saskatchewan's head coach but found "the glorious fifties and sixties were over, and he was the first Roughrider coach in sixteen years who did not have Ron Lancaster at quarterback." The Green Riders finished 2–14, including the worst start to a season in club history, going 0-12 before winning their first game.

Schedule

References

External links 
 Saskatchewan Roughriders Official Site
 Regina Leader-Post

Saskatchewan Roughriders